Walter Clarence Henderson (28 February 1891 – 20 September 1968) was a Progressive Conservative party member of the House of Commons of Canada. He was born in Carberry, Manitoba and became a farmer by career.

He was elected at the Cariboo riding in the 1958 general election, defeating Social Credit incumbent Bert Leboe. Henderson served only one term, the 24th Canadian Parliament, before Leboe retook the riding in the 1962 election.

References 
 

1891 births
1968 deaths
Members of the House of Commons of Canada from British Columbia
Progressive Conservative Party of Canada MPs
People from Carberry, Manitoba